Baker & Taylor, a distributor of books to public and academic libraries and schools, has been in business for over 190 years. It is based in Charlotte, North Carolina and currently owned by President & CEO Amandeep Kochar. Before being acquired by Follett in 2016, Baker & Taylor had $2.26 billion in sales, employed 3,750, and was #204 on Forbes list of privately owned companies in 2008.

Offerings
Baker & Taylor's core business unit focuses on sales/distribution of physical books.  Retail entertainment product sales ended in January 2019 as a result of a sale of the entertainment products division to La Vergne, TN's Ingram Entertainment. They also have added digital book content (e-books and e-spoken word audio) sales to libraries  and offer collection development and processing services to public libraries throughout the world (USA mainly). On May 1, 2019 Follet announced B&T will end distribution to the retail market to better align with Follet and focus on community and education. As part of the plan they will also close their NJ and Reno, NV warehouses resulting in 500+ being laid off. Publisher Services remain unaffected as "a cornerstone of Baker & Taylor's future growth strategy." Of late, digital book content is available through the company's Axis 360 platform via the Axis360 app. Prior to the sale of the division, its retail unit distributed an estimated <1 million book titles and previously sold non-core business materials: music CDs, DVDs, and Blu-ray discs to a declining number of brick and mortar retailers, Internet sites (Target.com, CDUniverse, BN.com), booksellers (indie shops & Barnes & Noble), craft stores, department stores (tbd) and several comic book retailers.

On 1/11/19 Follett/B&T sold its retail entertainment division (dvd, bd, vinyl, music CD) to La Vergne, TN's Ingram Entertainment.

Baker & Taylor announced on 6/18 an alignment with education and training provider, the for-profit school, PA's Penn Foster to provide working adults with skills development and training programs free via their local public library.  Specifically, the plan is to make Penn Foster’s library of “competency-based, career-aligned courses and playlists, including foundational career readiness skills, soft skills, and degree and certificate programs,” available to public library patrons through Baker & Taylor’s digital book platform.

Ownership history
Castle Harlan Partners was Baker & Taylor's majority owner, having acquired it from the investment firm Willis Stein & Partners. In 1994, the Follett Corporation of River Grove, Illinois had intended to acquire Baker & Taylor from the then majority holder, the Carlyle Group, which was looking to sell its interest to concentrate on the defense industry.

Arnie Wight became president of the company on May 23, 2007. Jack Eugster became chairman and chief executive officer, replacing Richard Willis, on January 4, 2008. Thomas Morgan took over the CEO role on July 7, 2008. In January 2014, former Brodart Books exec George Coe (who subsequently rejoined Brodart as pres) replaced both Wight and Morgan as president and CEO. In April 2017, after only two months as Follett/B&T CEO/Pres., George Coe departed the company. Follett then appointed former retail exec (Lechters, Barnes & Noble), NJ office based David Cully as president of B&T, the CEO position remains open.  Mr Coe rejoined the Brodart company in January 2020, as president & CEO 

After only two years in charge, David Cully announced on 6/21/19 his retirement from B&T.  Amandeep Kochar has been promoted to executive v-p of B&T and will lead the company after Cully's exit at the end of August 2019.

In February 2015, Baker & Taylor's publishing group and U,S. marketing services were acquired by Readerlink Distribution Services. Under the acquisition agreement, Readerlink took over ownership of the firm's 504,000 sq. ft. Indianapolis distribution center, as well as their general offices in San Diego and editorial offices in Ashland, Oregon. Baker and Taylor (UK) and B&T (Mexico) were not included in the acquisition, and will remain subsidiaries of Baker & Taylor. A Readerlink spokesperson said no offices, distribution centers, or operational changes were planned, and indicated that all current management and employees of the acquired divisions were joining the Readerlink.

In April 2016, Baker and Taylor was acquired by the Follett Corporation of McHenry, Illinois. According to The Chicago Tribune, the deal may boost the privately held Follett’s annual revenue by as much as 40 percent—from $2.6 billion to $3.6 billion. and resulted in senior mgmt changes at B&T.

In December 2018, it was reported that Ingram Content extended an offer in November 2018 to purchase Baker & Taylor's retail wholesale business from Follett. As a result, the Federal Trade Commission (FTC), started a preliminary investigation. The FTC has contacted leading book retailers, Amazon, major and independent book publishers to help determine the impact, if any, from the sale.

In November 2021, Follett Corporation announced a change in ownership of the Baker & Taylor division, which was divested to a private investment group led by Baker & Taylor President and CEO, Aman Kochar.

Lawsuits
In 1999, Baker & Taylor paid a settlement of $3 million USD to the U.S. government to settle a federal lawsuit. The suit claimed that Baker & Taylor had overcharged the federal government, as well as state and local libraries using federal funds. These charges occurred after 1992, when Baker & Taylor was sold by its then-parent company, W. R. Grace and Company. Baker & Taylor denied all allegations.

B&T has had other legal problems, notably U.S.  District Court for the Northern District of Illinois entered on July 10, 2013 a consent decree resolving a lawsuit brought by the U.S. Equal Employment  Opportunity Commission (EEOC) against Baker & Taylor, Inc.  The decree resolves Case No. 1:13 cv 03729,  which was assigned to U.S. District Judge John Nordberg.

Book wholesaler Baker & Taylor and its former parent company W. R. Grace agreed August 2 to pay $15.5 million to settle allegations that they overcharged schools and libraries in 18 states for books over more than 10 years. B&T, after spending five years in litigation with the U.S. government over an alleged violation of the False Claims Act, settled with the Department of Justice in July 1999 in return for release from all federal civil liability.

Divisions
In 2009, Baker & Taylor bought the North American arm of Blackwell UK as well as Blackwell's Australian library supplier, James Bennett. In return, Blackwell acquired the UK-based Lindsay and Croft from Baker & Taylor. Blackwell's North American division was merged into Baker & Taylor's YBP Library Services.

Baker & Taylor sold two business divisions in 2/2015, YBP Library Services (YBP) was acquired by EBSCO Publishing, Inc. and Baker & Taylor Marketing Services' U.S.-based warehouse club business (BTMS US) and Baker & Taylor Publishing Group (BTPG) were acquired by Readerlink Distribution Services, LLC. Sales terms were not disclosed. "These transactions allow Baker & Taylor to focus on our core business (Adult print materials) and new opportunities within those businesses and markets," said George Coe, then CEO of Baker & Taylor.

On January 11, 2019 B&T sold its retail entertainment products division to Ingram Entertainment Inc, of La Vergne, TN. Ingram is the leading distributor of physical home entertainment products. The sale included retail customer agreements for video and audio music products (DVD, BD, Vinyl & Music CD). Terms were not disclosed. Entertainment department staff layoffs were announced internally with affected employees departing by the end of April 2019.

After their unsuccessful sale to Ingram Content, Follett announced in May 2019 the summer '19 closure of B&T's Bridgewater, NJ and Reno, NV warehouses (500+ to be laid off) and the end of product sales and services to the retail market. In February 2020 they moved their remaining NJ office staff to 501 Rt 22 West in Bridgewater, NJ.

See also
List of book distributors

References

External links
  of Baker & Taylor global
  of Baker & Taylor UK Ltd

Book publishing companies based in North Carolina
Publishing companies established in 1828
Library-related organizations
Companies based in Charlotte, North Carolina
Privately held companies based in North Carolina
American companies established in 1828
2016 mergers and acquisitions